La colpa e la pena is a 1961 Italian short film directed by Marco Bellocchio. The screenplay and story were written by Bellocchio.

Cast
Maria Pia Conte, Alberto Maravalle and Stefano Satta

External links
 

1961 films
Italian short films
1960s Italian-language films
Films directed by Marco Bellocchio
1960s Italian films